The GEOStar-3 is a communications satellite spacecraft model made by Northrop Grumman Innovation Systems. GEOStar-3 represents an evolutionary growth from Northrop Grumman Innovation Systems GEOStar-2 platform. GEOStar-3 Bus can accommodate payloads of up to 800 kilograms and 8,000 watts.

Some changes to the GEOStar-3 bus provides increased battery capacity and solar array power, enabling it to provide up to eight kilowatts of power to the payload. The bus can be customized, including compatibility with all commercially available launch vehicles and the option to launch with another spacecraft on certain launch vehicles. In addition to increased payload power, GEOStar-3 also has the option of utilizing electric propulsion, which allows it to complete its fifteen to seventeen year mission life with less fuel.

Satellite Orders

References

Satellite buses
Orbital Sciences Corporation
Northrop Grumman spacecraft